The 2020–21 season was the 97th season in the existence of RC Celta de Vigo and the club's ninth consecutive season in the top flight of Spanish football. In addition to the domestic league, Celta Vigo participated in this season's edition of the Copa del Rey. The season covered the period from 20 July 2020 to 30 June 2021, with the late start to the season due to the COVID-19 pandemic in Spain.

Players

First-team squad

Reserve team

List of B-team players with senior squad numbers

Out on loan

Transfers

In

Out

Pre-season and friendlies

Competitions

Overall record

La Liga

League table

Results summary

Results by round

Matches
The league fixtures were announced on 31 August 2020.

Copa del Rey

Statistics

Appearances and goals
Last updated on 22 May 2021.

|-
! colspan=14 style=background:#dcdcdc; text-align:center|Goalkeepers

|-
! colspan=14 style=background:#dcdcdc; text-align:center|Defenders

|-
! colspan=14 style=background:#dcdcdc; text-align:center|Midfielders

|-
! colspan=14 style=background:#dcdcdc; text-align:center|Forwards

|-
! colspan=14 style=background:#dcdcdc; text-align:center| Players who have made an appearance or had a squad number this season but have left the club

|-
|}

Goalscorers

Notes

References

External links

RC Celta de Vigo seasons
Celta Vigo